Though Ireland has no formal honours system, there are systems of awards run by the state. Among those systems is the system of awards and medals awarded to members of the Defence Forces.

In addition to the medals issued by the Irish government, members of the Defence Forces are also allowed to wear medals denoting overseas service.  These medals are issued by International organisations like the United Nations, NATO, and the European Union as well as medals from other countries for United Nations Mandated peacekeeping missions.

Defence Forces medals

Notes:

The Distinguished Service Medal (An Bonn Seirbhíse Dearscna) is the second highest award of the Defence Forces.  It is awarded for individual acts of bravery, courage, leadership, resource or devotion to duty while serving with the Defence Forces, but below the level meriting award of the Military Medal for Gallantry.  Established in 1964, it is awarded in three classes with Honour, with Distinction, or with Merit.
The Good Conduct Medal (An Bonn Dea-Iompair) was an award presented to non-commissioned officers and privates.  Awarded between 16 September 1987 and 30 January 1990, it recognised individual meritorious service and exemplary conduct.
The Service Medal (An Bonn Seirbhíse) is awarded to non-commissioned officers and privates after 10 years of service and after 15 years of service to officers.  At 15 years of service non-commissioned officers are awarded the medal with the same ribbon as officers with a medal bar.  At 20 years, officers are awarded a bar to the medal as well.
The Service Medal (LDF and NSR) (An Bonn Seirbhíse (FCÁ agus SM)) is awarded to those members of the Local Defence Force or the Naval Service Reserve who complete at least seven years of service.  At 12 years the medal is awarded with a different ribbon and a medal bar, while at 21 years a second bar with 21 inscribed in its centre was awarded.
The Emergency Service Medal (An Bonn Seirbhíse Éigeandála) was established in 1944 to recognise service during The Emergency.  The medal was awarded for at least 365 days of either continuous or cumulative service between 3 September 1939 and 31 March 1946.  Awarded with two different types of ribbons, it recognised 11 groups for service during The Emergency, with the reverse of the medal indicating the group under which the recipient served.
The United Nations Peacekeepers Medal (An Bonn Chosantóirí Síochána na Náisiún Aontaithe) is awarded to those members of the Defence Forces who have served overseas on a United Nation Mission or United Nations Mandated Mission.  Created in 1989, no more than one medal may be awarded to any person.
The Military Star (An Réalt Míleata) can be awarded posthumously to those members of the Permanent Defence Forces who are killed or fatally wounded by direct result of hostile action or an act perpetrated by an enemy, opposing armed force, hostile belligerent or other party, involving the use of firepower or other lethal weapon.  Qualifying service is outside Ireland on military duty overseas.
The International Operational Service Medal is awarded to those members of the Defence Forces who have served overseas on a mission for which no other medal has been awarded.
 The 1916 Centenary Commemorative Medal was awarded to all members of the Permanent and Reserve Defence Forces who were on active service throughout the year 2016, a century since the 1916 Easter Rising, in acknowledgement for the ceremonial role played by Óglaigh na hÉireann across all aspects of the centenary commemorations programme.

United Nations medals

References

Footnotes

External links

Independent Ireland in World War II
Orders, decorations, and medals of Ireland
Military of the Republic of Ireland